KXFC 105.5 FM is a radio station licensed to Coalgate, Oklahoma.  The station broadcasts a Contemporary Hit Radio format and is owned by The Chickasaw Nation.

References

External links
KXFC's official website

XFC
Contemporary hit radio stations in the United States